Streptomyces fumanus is a bacterium species from the genus of Streptomyces which has been isolated from alluvial soil. Streptomyces fumanus produces dioxapyrrolomycin (an insecticide), pyrrolomycin G, pyrrolomycin H, pyrrolomycin I, pyrrolomycin J and fumaquinone.

Further reading

See also 
 List of Streptomyces species

References

External links
Type strain of Streptomyces fumanus at BacDive -  the Bacterial Diversity Metadatabase

fumanus
Bacteria described in 1958